Por Descubrir is a compilation album by flamenco guitarist Paco de Lucía that was released exclusively as part of the limited edition Integral box set.

The first four tracks are from de Lucía's first solo recording, an EP called La guitarra de Paco de Lucía that was released in 1964 when de Lucía was only 16 years old. In addition, there are other rare, unreleased recordings from various points in his career.

Track listing

"Rondeñas (1964)" – 4:15
"Aires andaluces (1964)" – 2:10
"Piropo Gaditano (1964)” – 4:10
"Cielo Sevillano (1964)" – 2:10
"Esencia gitana (1972)" – 3:36
"¿Por dónde caminas? (1978)" – 5:14
"Tema de amor (1979)" – 2:34
"Tema de Celos (1979)" – 1:22
"Tema andaluz (1979)" – 1:48
"Sevillanas (1992)" – 3:10
"Gabarre (1999)" – 4:52
"Plaza Real (2000)" – 4:21
"Niquelao (2000)" – 5:02

Musicians
Paco de Lucía – Flamenco guitar

References
 Gamboa, Manuel José and Nuñez, Faustino. (2003). Paco de Lucía. Madrid:Universal Music Spain.

2003 compilation albums
Paco de Lucía albums